Gui Yufang (21 September 1930 – 22 December 2022) was a Chinese translator. She was one of the foremost translators into Chinese of the works of the French novelist Guy de Maupassant.

Biography
Gui was born in Wuhan, Hubei in 1930. She entered Tsinghua University in 1949, majoring in French at the Department of Foreign Language, where she graduated in 1952.

In 1952, universities in China underwent a nationwide reshuffling. She was educated at the Department of French Language, Peking University from 1952 to 1953.
After graduation, Gui taught at Peking University. Gui started to publish works in 1957.

In 1966, the Cultural Revolution was launched by Mao Zedong, she was sent to the May Seventh Cadre Schools to work with her children in Jiangxi.

In 1976, Hua Guofeng and Ye Jianying toppled the Gang of Four, she was rehabilitated, she returned to Beijing and taught at Peking University.

Gui retired in 1997. She died on 22 December 2022, at the age of 92.

Translation
 The Complete Works of Maupassant (Guy de Maupassant)
 In Search of Lost Time (Marcel Proust)
 (Marcel Proust)
 Little Good-For-Nothing (Alphonse Daudet)
  (Michelle Buto)
 Childhood (Natalie Sarraute)
 (Margaret Duras)
 (Margaret Duras) 
 (Margaret Duras) 
 (Francois Mauriac)

Awards
 Chinese Translation Association – Competent Translator (2004)

References

1930 births
2022 deaths
Writers from Wuhan
Tsinghua University alumni
Peking University alumni
People's Republic of China translators
French–Chinese translators
20th-century Chinese translators
21st-century Chinese translators